The Bell Telephone Building is a 339-foot (103 m) art deco skyscraper in Downtown Pittsburgh, Pennsylvania. It was completed in 1923 and has 20 floors. It is the 22nd-tallest building in the city.

See also
List of tallest buildings in Pittsburgh

References

External links
Emporis
Skyscraperpage

Skyscraper office buildings in Pittsburgh
Office buildings completed in 1923
Bell System
Art Deco architecture in Pennsylvania
Telecommunications buildings in the United States
1923 establishments in Pennsylvania